CONSORT Colleges is a term used to refer to the consortium of four academic libraries in Ohio: Denison University, Kenyon College, Ohio Wesleyan University and The College of Wooster.  The primary objective of this collaboration is to share the cost of library resources and services including: the CONSORT integrated library system; CONStor, a high density off-site storage facility; cooperative collection development; library technical services work flow redesign; and an information literacy tutorial.

The CONSORT Colleges along with Oberlin College comprise the Five Colleges of Ohio.

CONSORT
CONSORT is the name of the combined integrated library system shared by the CONSORT Colleges. The system runs on the Millennium software product developed by Innovative Interfaces, Inc. CONSORT has been a member of OhioLINK since 1996.

References
 Five Colleges of Ohio Library Resources & Initiatives
 Denison - Kenyon Library Technical Services Work Redesign

External links 
CONSORT Home Page

Education in Ohio
Kenyon College
Library consortia in Ohio